Ri Kum-chol (born 9 December 1991) is a North Korean former footballer. He represented North Korea on at least seven occasions between 2015 and 2018.

Career statistics

International

References

1991 births
Living people
North Korean footballers
North Korea international footballers
Association football midfielders
Wolmido Sports Club players